Author's Choice Monthly was a series of 29 short story collections that ran from 1989 through 1992. They were published by Pulphouse Publishing. They tended to be fairly short (in the 100 page range) and were produced in three different states:
 An unsigned trade paperback state (usually around 1,000 copies)
 A signed hardback state of 300 copies
 A signed, leatherbound hardback state of 75 copies
However, like many Pulphouse titles, frequently there were additional unspecified numbers of "PC" (Publisher's Copies) available, including one in a red leather "staff state."

 The Old Funny Stuff, by George Alec Effinger, October 1989
 Unthreatened by the Morning Light, by Karl Edward Wagner, November 1989
 Daily Voices, by Lisa Goldstein, December 1989
 Nine Hard Questions About the Nature of the Universe, by Lewis Shiner, January 1990
 Into the Eighth Decade, by Jack Williamson, February 1990
 Peripheral Vision, by Karen Joy Fowler, March 1990
 Neon Twilight, by Edward Bryant, April 1990
 Swatting at the Cosmos, by James Morrow, May 1990
 Heroines, by James Patrick Kelly, June 1990
 Tales from a Vanished Country, by Elizabeth A. Lynn, July 1990
 Skyrocket Steele Conquers the Universe, by Ron Goulart, August 1990
 True Minds, by Spider Robinson, September 1990
 Ad Statum Perspicuum, by F. Paul Wilson, October 1990
 Legacy of Fire, by Nina Kiriki Hoffman, November 1990
 Most Emphatically Not SF, Almost, by Michael Bishop, December 1990
 State of Grace, by Kate Wilhelm, January 1991
 Ma Qui and Other Phantoms, by Alan Brennert, February 1991
 Stories by Mama Lansdale's Youngest Boy, by Joe Lansdale, March 1991
 Two That Came True, by Judith Moffett, April 1991
 A Sensitive Dependence on Initial Conditions, by Kim Stanley Robinson, May 1991
 God's Nose, by Damon Knight, June 1991
 Hedgework and Guessery, by Charles de Lint, July 1991
 It's Been Fun, by Esther Friesner, August 1991
 The Naked Flesh of Feeling, by J. N. Williamson, September 1991
 The Alien Heart, by Mike Resnick, October 1991
 Myths, Legends, and True History, by Geoffrey A. Landis, November 1991
 Gone to Earth, by Roger Zelazny, December 1991
 Wong's Lost and Found Emporium and Other Oddities, by William F. Wu, June 1992
 Moonstone and Tiger-Eye, by Suzy McKee Charnas, August 1992

Lists of fantasy books